The Mistral T-21 is a Canadian trailerable sailboat, that was designed by Mistral Sailboats and first built in 1978.

Production
The design was built by Mistral Sailboats in Longueuil, Quebec, Canada, starting in 1978, but the company had ceased production by 1987 when it went out of business.

Design
The Mistral T-21 is a small recreational keelboat, built predominantly of fibreglass. It has a fractional sloop rig, a raked stem, a vertical transom, a  transom-hung rudder controlled by a tiller and a retractable centreboard keel. It displaces  and carries  of ballast.

The boat is normally fitted with a small  outboard motor for docking and manoeuvring.

The design has sleeping accommodation for four people, with a single berth in the bow cabin, a drop down table tat converts to a double berth in the main cabin and a quarter berth on the port side, under the cockpit. The galley is located on the port side just forward of the companionway ladder. The galley is equipped with a two-burner stove and a sink. The head is located in the bow cabin on the starboard side.

Operational history
In a 2010 review Steve Henkel wrote, "best features: Her layout is very intriguing for a mere 21-footer, encompassing at least two single berths and a double, a dinette, a hanging locker, and a head that, though lacking a door, is virtually 'enclosed' in the forepeak, (The literature we have says she has berths for five, but we can't find the fifth one.) With her fully retracting high-aspect centerboard, and drawing only 1' 2" with the board up, she should be easy to launch and retrieve from a trailer. Worst features: The drawings seem to indicate that the centerboard is relatively light, perhaps 100 to 200 pounds at most. If so, the ballast, which is reported to be 750 pounds, must be located not far below the waterline, which would seem to make it relatively ineffective."

See also
List of sailing boat types

Similar sailboats
Cal 20
Core Sound 20 Mark 3
Flicka 20
Halman 20
Hunter 18.5
Hunter 19-1
Hunter 19 (Europa)
Hunter 20
Hunter 212
Hunter 216
Paceship 20
Sandpiper 565
San Juan 21
Siren 17
Sirius 22

References

External links

Keelboats
1970s sailboat type designs
Sailing yachts
Trailer sailers
Sailboat type designs by Mistral Sailboats
Sailboat types built by Mistral Sailboats